Neville Beckford (1952 – 21 February 2011), better known as Jah Woosh, was a Jamaican reggae deejay and record producer, primarily known for his work in the 1970s.

Biography
Born in Kingston, Jamaica, Beckford served an apprenticeship as a mechanic before forming a duo with Reggae George, Neville & George, and auditioning for Jamaica's top producers. Unsuccessful as a duo, they both went on to solo careers.  Beckford became the resident deejay on Prince Lloyd's sound system, and was noticed by producer George Bell, who took him into the studio to record "Angela Davis", now under the pseudonym Jah Woosh. Although the single was not a hit, it prompted Rupie Edwards to produce the debut album, Jah Woosh, released in 1974 on the United Kingdom Cactus label. Chalice Blaze and Psalms of Wisdom followed in 1976, these three albums establishing a reputation in the UK. A string of albums and singles followed through the 1970s and early 1980s.

Woosh also contributed to Adrian Sherwood's Singers & Players collective, appearing on albums by Creation Rebel, Prince Far I, Bim Sherman, and Style Scott's  Dub Syndicate.

Beckford also worked as a producer, self-producing much of his work from 1976 onwards, and producing other artists such as Bim Sherman, Horace Andy, Larry Marshall, and his old friend Reggae George. He set up the "Original Music" record label, through which he has reissued some of his 1970s material.

He died on 21 February 2011, aged 58.

Albums
Jah Woosh (1974) Cactus
Psalms of Wisdom (1976) Ja-Man/Black Wax
Chalice Blaze (1976) Midnite/Student
Dreadlocks Affair (1976) Trojan
Loaded with TNT (1976) Trenchtown
Jah Jah Dey Dey (1976) Cactus
Lick Him With The Dustbin (1977) K&B
Gathering Israel (1978) Dread & Dread
Religious Dread (1978) Trojan
Spiderlemon (1978) JP Records
Gun Fight At OK Karrol (1978) Pioneer International
Ital Movement (197?) Abraham
Marijuana World Tour (1979) Creation Rebel
Rebellion (1981) Form (with Sis Bee)
Rastaman (1981) German LP
Sing And Chant Jah Woosh (1982) September
Some Sign (1985) Sky Juice
 Jah bless the children (1986) produced by Neville Beckford aka Jah Woosh on Sky Juice
Fire In a Blackamix (1993) Blackamix (with Mixman)

Compilations
We Chat You Rock (1987) Trojan (with I-Roy)
The Best of Jah Woosh (1993) Rhino
Dub Plate Special (1993) Original Music
Jah Woosh Meets Jah Stitch at Leggo Sounds (1995) Leggo (with Jah Stitch)
DJ Legend Original Music
Collection (2001) Original Music

References

External links
 Jah Woosh at discogs.com

1952 births
2011 deaths
Jamaican reggae musicians
Musicians from Kingston, Jamaica